Moonfleet is a British period television drama series which aired on BBC One in 1984. It is based on the classic 1898 adventure novel Moonfleet by J. Meade Falkner, about smuggling on the Dorset coast in the eighteenth century, earlier made into a 1955 film of the same title directed by Fritz Lang.

Main cast
 Victoria Blake as Grace Maskew
 David Daker as  Elzevir Block
 Adam Godley as John Trenchard
 Bernard Gallagher as Sexton Ratsey
 David Gant as Reverend Glennie
 Ewan Hooper as Magistrate Maskew
 Stewart Harwood as Thomas
 Hilary Mason as Jane Arnold

References

Bibliography
 Goble, Alan. The Complete Index to Literary Sources in Film. Walter de Gruyter, 1999.

External links
 

1984 British television series debuts
1984 British television series endings
1980s British drama television series
BBC television dramas
Television series set in the 18th century
Television shows based on British novels
1980s British television miniseries
English-language television shows
Television shows set in Dorset